Jeffrey Alan Slade (March 1, 1941 – February 11, 2012) was an American professional basketball player. He played in three games for the Chicago Zephyrs of the NBA in the beginning of the 1962–63 season after being selected by them in the 1962 NBA draft. He scored four total points in his career.

References

External links
Kenyon College Hall of Fame profile
Jeff Slade obituary

1941 births
2012 deaths
American men's basketball players
Basketball players from Illinois
Chicago Zephyrs draft picks
Chicago Zephyrs players
Forwards (basketball)
Kenyon Lords basketball players
People from Chicago Heights, Illinois
People from Sylvania, Ohio